Barry Edmund Ryan (born January 23, 1948) is an American former Roman Catholic priest who pleaded guilty to repeatedly molesting a six-year-old boy, for which he was sentenced to two years in prison.

Biography
After his ordination in 1976, Ryan worked in parishes in Brooklyn, New York before commissioning as a chaplain in the U.S. Air Force in 1984. He was suspended from the priesthood in 1995 after allegations of improper sexual conduct while he had been stationed at Mobile, Alabama. Ryan was suspended from his priestly duties.

Until the spring of 2003, he was a library media specialist at Martin County High School in Stuart, Florida, where he was named Teacher of the Year in 2001. He took a medical leave of absence in the wake of news reports that he might have been involved in improper sexual activity during his time as an Air Force chaplain. He was diagnosed around this time with reportedly terminal liver cancer. Shortly afterwards, between May and October 2003, he forced a six-year-old boy to perform oral sex upon him at the boy's family home in Long Island.

In his written confession, Ryan said he received inpatient treatment for paedophilia, depression and alcoholism at Saint Luke Institute, a psychiatric hospital in Silver Spring, Maryland in 2004. Ryan attempted to commit suicide in 2007 by slitting his own throat. Shortly thereafter, he was ordered from the Missouri hospice in which he was residing to begin serving his two-year sentence in New York. Ryan currently resides in Dittmer, Missouri, at the Vianney Renewal Center.

See also
Roman Catholic Church sex abuse scandal
Roman Catholic priests accused of sex offenses
Crimen sollicitationis

References

External links
 Barry Ryan's entry at New York Sex Offender Registry
 Barry Ryan's entry at Missouri Sex Offender Registry 
 Abuse Profile, offender.fdle.state.fl.us

1948 births
Living people
American people convicted of child sexual abuse
Catholic Church sexual abuse scandals in the United States
People from Brooklyn
People from Jefferson County, Missouri
American Roman Catholic clergy of Irish descent
Catholic priests convicted of child sexual abuse
United States Air Force chaplains
Laicized Roman Catholic priests
20th-century American Roman Catholic priests
People from Palm City, Florida
Catholics from New York (state)
Catholics from Florida
Catholics from Missouri
American members of the clergy convicted of crimes